August 24 - Eastern Orthodox liturgical calendar - August 26

All fixed commemorations below are observed on September 7 by Eastern Orthodox Churches on the Old Calendar.

For August 25, Orthodox Churches on the Old Calendar commemorate the Saints listed on August 12

Saints

 Apostle Titus of the Seventy Disciples, first Bishop of Crete (1st century)
 Saints Barses (378) and Eulogius (c. 386), Bishops of Edessa, and St. Protogenes, Bishop of Carrhae (c. 387), Confessors.
 Saints John the Cappadocian (520) and Epiphanius (535), Patriarchs of Constantinople.
 Saint Menas, Patriarch of Constantinople (552)
 Saint John, Bishop of Karpathos (7th century)
 Synaxis of Hierarchs of Crete, Bishops of Gortyna:
 Cyril (c. 303)
 Eumenius (7th century)  (see also: September 18)
 Andrew of Crete, Archbishop (740)

Pre-Schism Western saints

 Saint Geruntius of Italica, a missionary in Spain in the Apostolic Age, Bishop of Talco (Italica, near Seville) and martyr (c. 100)
 Martyrs Eusebius, Pontian, Vincent and Peregrinus, in Rome (c. 192)
 Saints Nemesius and Lucilla, a deacon, and his daughter martyred in Rome under Valerian (c. 260)
 Saint Genesius of Rome (Genesius the Actor), an actor in Rome who took part in a satire on Orthodox baptism, was suddenly converted and martyred (c. 286 or c. 303)
 Saint Genesius of Arles (Genès), martyr (303)
 Saint Maginus (Magí), martyr (304)
 Saint Marcian of Saignon, founder of the monastery of St Eusebius in Apt (485)
 Saint Aredius of Limousin (Yrieix, Yriez), Gaul (591)
 Saint Patricia of Naples, virgin (c. 665)
 Saint Ebba the Elder, Abbess of Coldingham, Northumbria (683)
 Saint Hunegund (c. 690)
 Saint Warinus (Guarinus, Warren), son of St Sigrada, martyred in France by the tyrant Ebroin who was at war with his brother St Leodegarius (7th century) 
 Saint Gregory of Utrecht, Abbot of St. Martin Monastery in Utrecht (775)

Post-Schism Orthodox saints

 Venerable Gennadius Scholarius, Patriarch of Constantinople (c. 1473)

New martyrs and confessors

 New Hieromartyr Moses (Kozhin), Hieromonk of Solovki Monastery (1931)
 New Hieromartyr Vladimir Moschansky, Priest (1938)

Other commemorations

 Translation of the relics (580) of Apostle Bartholomew (1st century) from Anastasiopolis to Lipari.
 Translation of the relics (580?) of Martyr Sabbas of Venethalon (Venetalus) (1st century)
 Translation of the relics (c. 860) of St. Hilda of Whitby (680)
 Repose of Abbess Magdalene of Sevsk Convent (1848)
 Repose of Monk Benjamin of Valaam (1848)
 Repose of Abbot Nikon (Vorobiev) of Gzhatsk (1963)

Icon gallery

Notes

References

Sources
 August 25 / September 7. Orthodox Calendar (PRAVOSLAVIE.RU).
 September 7 / August 25. Holy Trinity Russian Orthodox Church (A parish of the Patriarchate of Moscow).
 August 25. OCA - The Lives of the Saints.
 The Autonomous Orthodox Metropolia of Western Europe and the Americas (ROCOR). St. Hilarion Calendar of Saints for the year of our Lord 2004. St. Hilarion Press (Austin, TX). p. 63.
 The Twenty-Fourth Day of the Month of August. Orthodoxy in China.
 August 25. Latin Saints of the Orthodox Patriarchate of Rome.
 The Roman Martyrology. Transl. by the Archbishop of Baltimore. Last Edition, According to the Copy Printed at Rome in 1914. Revised Edition, with the Imprimatur of His Eminence Cardinal Gibbons. Baltimore: John Murphy Company, 1916. pp. 257–258.
 Rev. Richard Stanton. A Menology of England and Wales, or, Brief Memorials of the Ancient British and English Saints Arranged According to the Calendar, Together with the Martyrs of the 16th and 17th Centuries. London: Burns & Oates, 1892. pp. 411–413.

 Greek Sources
 Great Synaxaristes:  25 ΑΥΓΟΥΣΤΟΥ. ΜΕΓΑΣ ΣΥΝΑΞΑΡΙΣΤΗΣ.
  Συναξαριστής. 25 Αυγούστου. ECCLESIA.GR. (H ΕΚΚΛΗΣΙΑ ΤΗΣ ΕΛΛΑΔΟΣ).

 Russian Sources
  7 сентября (25 августа). Православная Энциклопедия под редакцией Патриарха Московского и всея Руси Кирилла (электронная версия). (Orthodox Encyclopedia - Pravenc.ru).

August in the Eastern Orthodox calendar